Jordan Selwyn is a New Zealand film and stage actor. Selwyn is best known for his role in New Zealand film The Map Reader starring alongside Rebecca Gibney. Selwyn, nephew of actor Don Selwyn, was 17 when filming commenced on The Map Reader. Selwyn grew up on Auckland's North Shore, and attended Kristin School.

References

New Zealand male film actors
New Zealand male stage actors
1989 births
Living people
People educated at Kristin School